Lyncestis  is a genus of moths of the family Noctuidae.

Species
 Lyncestis albisigna Wileman & South, 1920
 Lyncestis amphix (Cramer, 1777)
 Lyncestis dargei Hacker & Fibiger, 2006
 Lyncestis diascota Hampson, 1916
 Lyncestis grandidieri Viette, 1968
 Lyncestis knudlarseni Hacker & Fibiger, 2006
 Lyncestis kruegeri Hacker & Fibiger, 2006
 Lyncestis mahagonica Saalmüller, 1891
 Lyncestis melanoschista (Meyrick, 1897)
 Lyncestis metaleuca Hampson, 1896
 Lyncestis mimica Gaede, 1939
 Lyncestis phaeocrossa Turner, 1932
 Lyncestis subsignata (Walker, 1865)
 Lyncestis unilinea (Swinhoe, 1885)
 Lyncestis voeltzkowi Viette, 1965

References
 Hacker, H. & Fibiger, M. (2006). "Updated list of Micronoctuidae, Noctuidae (s.l.), and Hyblaeidae species of Yemen, collected during three expeditions in 1996, 1998 and 2000, with comments and descriptions of species." Esperiana Buchreihe zur Entomologie 12: 75-166.
 Natural History Museum Lepidoptera genus database

Ophiusini
Moth genera